Padise is a village in Lääne-Harju Parish, Harju County in northern Estonia.

Padise is the birthplace of Estonian poet and author Arved Viirlaid (1922–2015).

Gallery

References

Villages in Harju County
Castles of the Teutonic Knights